WHBY (1150 AM) is a commercial radio station licensed to Kimberly, Wisconsin, that serves the Green Bay and Appleton-Oshkosh areas. The station is owned by Woodward Communications and it airs a news/talk radio format. WHBY's studios and microwave transmitter are located on East College Avenue in Appleton. 

By day, WHBY is powered at 20,000 watts.  At night, the power increases to 25,000 watts.  WHBY uses a directional antenna with a six-tower array to protect other stations on 1150 AM from interference.  The transmitter is in Neenah, on Wisconsin Highway 76.  Programming is also heard on FM translators in Appleton, Oshkosh and Wrightstown.

Programming
On weekdays, WHBY has local news and talk shows in morning and afternoon drive time, and part of middays.  The rest of the schedule is made up of nationally syndicated programs:  The Ramsey Show with Dave Ramsey, Our American Stories with Lee Habeeb, Ground Zero with Clyde Lewis, Coast to Coast AM with George Noory and This Morning, America's First News with Gordon Deal.  Most hours begin with an update from CBS Radio News.

Specialty shows are heard on weekends, focusing on health, money, the outdoors, home repair, cars, movies and travel, along with repeats of weekday programs.  Weekend shows include The Tech Guy with Leo Laporte, Ron Ananian The Car Doctor, Travel with Rudy Maxa and classic radio shows on Saturday evenings.  Sports broadcasts include Westwood One NFL and NCAA broadcasts, Milwaukee Brewers baseball and University of Wisconsin–Madison Badgers football and basketball as well as local high school sports.

History

Early years
WHBY was initially licensed to St. Norbert College in De Pere, Wisconsin. It signed on the air on April 5, 1925.  WHBY featured two test programs: a morning sermon, and evening musical entertainment, on 1200 kHz. Regular weekly programming began on April 8. WHBY's license allowed it to broadcast at all hours.

WHBY stayed at 1200 kHz after the implementation of General Order 40 in 1928, designated as a local station, with 100 watts of power.  In the 1930s, WHBY was authorized to broadcast at 250 watts by day, 100 watts at night.  Its studios were in the Berlin Building in Green Bay.  It moved to 1230 kHz with the implementation of the North American Regional Broadcasting Agreement (NARBA) on March 29, 1941.

In 1975, Woodward Communications acquired WHBY.   The station added more talk, sports and news programming, while reducing music shows.

Move to 1150 kHz 
On September 16, 1991, the staff of both WHBY and WYNE (AM 1150) were informed that Woodward Communications, parent of WHBY, would be purchasing WYNE from Fox Valley Broadcasting, Inc. for a price of $965,000. The purchase would allow WHBY to move from 1230 kHz, and to increase its broadcast power from 1,000 to 5,000 watts, using WYNE's existing transmission equipment. The sale allowed WHBY to join WNAM as the only other Fox Valley AM station broadcasting with 5,000 watts of power at that time.

The purchase was approved by the FCC as part of a larger initiative to reduce the number of AM radio stations competing for signal strength.  The cutover (which moved WHBY to 1150 kHz and ended the existence of WYNE) occurred at 7:45 a.m. on December 19, 1991.

1150 AM is a Regional broadcast frequency.

AM Transmitter and FM Translators 
In 2004, WHBY applied to build a new six-tower site on what was then U.S. Route 45 (and today is Wisconsin Highway 76) in the Town of Vinland. The new antenna array allowed the station to increase its power further, to 20,000 watts (daytime) and 25,000 watts (nighttime).

In November 2016, WHBY added its first FM translator, W278AU, serving Appleton on 103.5 MHz.  In November 2017, two more translators were added, both at 106.3 MHz: W292FA serving Oshkosh and W292DR serving Wrightstown and southern sections of Brown County.

References

External links
FCC History Cards for WHBY

WHBY - The Inception And Early History Of The Voice Of The Fox River Valley

HBY
News and talk radio stations in the United States
Radio stations established in 1925